The National Museum of Fine Arts is a museum in Chișinău, Moldova, founded in November 1939 by Alexandru Plămădeală and Auguste Baillayre.

Overview

In 1939, the sculptor Alexandru Plămădeală selected some 160 works by Bassarabian and Romanian artists in order to set up the first Picture Gallery of Chișinău whose director was Auguste Baillayre, painter and professor at Ecolle de Belle Arte of Chişinău. The first museum of Bassarabian fine art was opened on November 26, 1939; its successor becomes National Art Museum of Moldova. In the first days of World War II, the art pieces displayed in the Gallery, together with others donated by the Ministry of Culture and Cults of Romania were loaded into two lorries and delivered to Kharkiv; the destiny of these collections remains unknown until present.

Building 
The building of the museum (architect Alexander Bernardazzi) is a monument in Moldova. It was previously known as Dadiani's female gymnasium.

Another department of the museum is located in the Herța House (urban villa), Ștefan cel Mare și Sfînt Avenue.

Solo exhibitions
The museum hasgeneral and specific exhibitions. Ada Zevin was among those with solo exhibitions in 1960, 1970 and 1980.

Selected artworks

Selected prints

See also
 National Museum of Art of Romania

References

External links 

 National Art Museum in Chisinau
 Artistul european Auguste Baillayre, omagiat la Muzeul de Artă din Chișinău
 

Art museums and galleries in Moldova
National museums of Moldova
Buildings and structures in Chișinău
Culture in Chișinău
Art museums established in 1939
1939 establishments in Romania